Shambles Square is a square in Manchester, England, created in 1999 around the rebuilt Old Wellington Inn and Sinclair's Oyster Bar next to The Mitre Hotel.

Etymology 
"Shambles" was a name originally used for a street of butchers shops where meat was slaughtered and sold. It is derived from the Middle English word schamel, which meant a bench, as for displaying meat for sale. A shambles would have had blood, pieces of meat and offal running down the gutter, and although the original meaning of the word fell into disuse, it survived as a word meaning a scene of disorder. There are also streets known as the Shambles in other towns in the United Kingdom, such as York, Stroud, Worcester, Sevenoaks, Chesterfield and Armagh, and a public house in Lutterworth which was once a butcher's shop and abattoir.

History 

The building that is now The Old Wellington Inn was built in 1552 next to Manchester's market square. In 1554, it was purchased by the Byrom family and became part residence and part drapers shop. The writer John Byrom was born there in 1692. The premises were licensed in 1862 and became the Vintners Arms, then the Kenyon Vaults and later The Old Wellington Inn. The building was extended in the 18th century to house John Shaw's Punch House which, as the name suggests, was licensed for the sale of strong alcoholic punch and became a meeting place for High Tories and possibly Jacobites. The customers usually assembled around 6 o'clock and, according to rule, called for "sixpennyworth of punch". John Shaw was a stickler for discipline, having formerly been a trooper and fought in the wars of Queen Anne's reign, and the rules of the establishment were strictly enforced. Eight o'clock was the hour fixed by law for closing and, as soon as the clock struck eight, Shaw would present himself before his guests and proclaim in a loud voice "Eight o'clock gentlemen, eight o'clock!" accompanying the announcement with the suggestive cracking of a horsewhip. This would normally soon clear the house but, if the cracking of the whip failed, his maid, Molly Owen, was ordered to use the contents of her mop bucket to "expedite the movement of the loiterer". When one Colonel Stanley was elected Member of Parliament for the county he took his friends to Shaw's, and when "Eight o'clock" was announced as usual, said that he hoped Mr Shaw would not press the matter on this special occasion. Shaw replied "Colonel Stanley, you are a lawmaker and should not be a lawbreaker, and if you and your friends do not leave the room in five minutes you will find your shoes full of water!" Within that time Molly came in with her mop bucket and the Colonel and his friends were required to beat a hasty retreat. Shaw was master of the punch house for 58 years until he died in 1796 at the age of 83. After Shaw's death the punch house was kept by Peter Fearnhead, with the assistance of Molly under the same rules, until it was sold about ten years later to William Goodall, who had been the proprietor of the Fleece Tavern at the opposite end of the Old Shambles. The new landlord demolished part of the building and converted the rest into The King's Head Tavern in 1807. It later became known as Sinclair's, until oysters were introduced to the menu in 1845 and it became Sinclair's Oyster Bar, the name it retains to this day.

The butchers' stalls were moved from the market place in the Old Shambles to new premises in Brown Street, built by the Lord of the Manor, Sir Oswald Mosley, in 1827. Many of the buildings in the market place were demolished in the Victorian era to make way for road improvements and the rest were destroyed in the Manchester Blitz in 1940, leaving the Old Shambles as one of the few pre-19th century buildings, and The Wellington Inn as the only surviving Tudor building in Manchester City Centre. The buildings were both designated as Grade II listed buildings in 1952.

 In 1974, most of the old property between Shudehill and Market Street was demolished to accommodate the new Arndale Shopping Centre. The Old Shambles was underpinned with a concrete raft and, according to the Greater Manchester County Records Office, jacked-up 4 feet 9 inches to fit in with this development in the newly created Shambles Square.

In June 1996, an IRA bomb exploded in nearby Corporation Street and badly damaged many of the surrounding buildings, but the Old Shambles was protected by the concrete buildings around it and suffered only minimal damage. In 1998, £12m funding was provided by the government-sponsored Redevelopment Agency English Partnerships, private companies, the European Community and Manchester City Council to redevelop Shambles Square. The buildings were subsequently dismantled and moved 70 metres northwards to their present location, close to Manchester Cathedral, in 1999. The Old Wellington Inn and Sinclair's were rebuilt at 90 degrees to each other and joined together by a stone extension to form two sides of the new Shambles Square.

The third side of the square is fronted by The Mitre Hotel which was built as The Old Church Tavern in 1815. Prince Charles Edward Stuart is said to have reviewed his troops by the tavern in 1745. It was renamed The Mitre Hotel around 1835.

See also 
History of Manchester
Structure relocation: Reassembly Moves

References

Notes

Bibliography

External links 
Manchester Evening News archive of Manchester blitz with image of the Old Shambles amidst the devastation.
How the medieval Shambles pubs were moved – piece by piece

Further reading
Stancliffe, F. S. (1938) John Shaw's, 1738–1938. Timperley: Sherratt & Hughes

External links 
 

Squares in Manchester
Buildings and structures in Manchester
Tourist attractions in Manchester
Oyster bars